Cannabis in Iraq is illegal. Possession of even the smallest amounts can lead to 3 to 15 years in prison.

History
Cannabis was allegedly introduced to Iraq in 1230 CE during the reign of Caliph Al-Mustansir Bi'llah by the entourage of Bahraini rulers visiting Iraq. However, it was likely used by the people of Mesopotamia as early as the late Bronze Age.

References

Iraq
Drugs in Iraq